Shari B. Olefson is an American business attorney certified by the Florida bar in real estate, a Civil Circuit-Supreme Court Certified Mediator, television news expert, speaker, author, and advocate.

Early life and education
Olefson was born in New York City and raised both in New York and Florida, where she graduated from Pine Crest School in 1981. she graduated from Carnegie Mellon University with degrees in journalism and psychology in 1985, from the Benjamin N. Cardozo School of Law at Yeshiva University and from the University of Miami Masters of Law program in 1989. She subsequently studied broadcast journalism at Columbia University and earned a master's degree in psychology from Nova Southeastern University.

Career

While in law school, Olefson interned at the Broward County Public Defenders office and worked for a New Your City based law firm before opening a general private practice, including probate, real estate, and business transactions and litigation, in South Florida.  While writing her first book, Olefson became a subject matter expert on the real estate crises for television networks including CNBC, MSNBC, Fox News, CBS, PBS, CSPANN, Bloomberg, and a speaker at industry conferences. During this same time, she also became a resource for policy makers and worked with Florida's Collins Center, meditating residential foreclosure cases.

Since 2010 Olefson has been the television news expert for the Fox and NBC network affiliates situated in West Palm Beach, Florida with weekly segments covering legal and consumer issues tied to current news. Her book 101 Ways to Stay Out of Court: Navigating Life's Little Legal Landmines is based on viewer questions received during this time.

Olefson has continued to serve as a Mediation, but left the practice of law in 2012 to serve as Director of a non-partisan The Carnegie Group think tank.

On May 4, 2018, Olefson enter the Florida primary race for Broward Circuit Court judge, Group 36.

She is the author of several books on American real estate law and economics.

Works 
Financial Fresh Start: Your Five-Step Plan for Adapting and Prospering in the New Economy  
Foreclosure Nation: Mortgaging the American Dream=   According to WorldCat, the book is held in 246 libraries  
 Structuring Commercial Real Estate Transactions 
 Florida Foreclosure Defense Strategies: An Immediate Look at the Best Practices for Assisting Distressed Homeowners in Florida (Aspatore Special Report) 
 Florida Foreclosure: What Lawyers Need to Know Now

References

External links 
 Official website
 Sun-Sentinel article

American lawyers
Date of birth missing (living people)
People from New York (state)
Living people
American women lawyers
Year of birth missing (living people)
21st-century American women